Michael Alan Grodin (born December 26, 1951) is Professor of Health Law, Bioethics, and Human Rights at the Boston University School of Public Health, where he has received the distinguished Faculty Career Award for Research and Scholarship, and 20 teaching awards, including the "Norman A. Scotch Award for Excellence in Teaching." He is also Professor of Family Medicine and Psychiatry at the Boston University School of Medicine. In addition, Dr. Grodin is the Director of the Project on Medicine and the Holocaust at the Elie Wiesel Center for Judaic Studies, and a member of the faculty of the Division of Religious and Theological Studies. He has been on the faculty at Boston University for 35 years. He completed his B.S. degree at the Massachusetts Institute of Technology, his M.D. degree from the Albert Einstein College of Medicine, and his postdoctoral and fellowship training at UCLA and Harvard University.

Biography
Michael Grodin is the Medical Ethicist at Boston Medical Center, and for thirteen years served as the Human Studies Chairman for the Department of Health and Hospitals of the City of Boston. He is a fellow of the Hastings Center; served on the board of directors of Public Responsibility in Medicine and Research, and the American Society of Law, Medicine and Ethics; and serves on the Advisory Board of the Center for the Philosophy and History of Science. He was a member of the National Committee on Bioethics of the American Academy of Pediatrics and the Committee on Ethics of the American College of Obstetricians and Gynecologists. Professor Grodin served on the Ethics Committee of the Massachusetts Center for Organ Transplantation, was a consultant to the National Human Subjects Protection Review Panel of the National Institutes of Health AIDS Program Advisory Committee, and is a consultant on Ethics and Research with Human Subjects for the International Organizations of Medical Sciences and the World Health Organization. He is a member of the Ethics Review Board of Physicians for Human Rights.

Grodin is the Co-Founder of Global Lawyers and Physicians: Working Together for Human Rights; Co-Director of the Boston Center for Refugee Health and Human Rights: Caring for Survivors of Torture; and has received a special citation from the United States Holocaust Memorial Museum in recognition of his "profound contributions - through original and creative research - to the cause of Holocaust education and remembrance." He is an internationally recognized authority on Medicine during the Holocaust. The Refugee Center which he Co-Directs received the 2002 Outstanding Achievement Award from the Political Asylum/Immigration Representation Project for "sensitivity and dedication in caring for the health and human rights of refugees and survivors of torture." He is a Member of the Global Implementation Project of the Istanbul Protocol Manual on the Effective Investigation and Documentation of Torture and Other Cruel, Inhuman or Degrading Treatment or Punishment, and an Advisor to UNESCO. Grodin was the 2000 Julius Silberger Scholar and 2014 Kravetz award recipient as an elected member of the Boston Psychoanalytic Society and Institute and the American Psychoanalytic Association. Four times named one of America's Top Physicians, he has received four national Humanism in Medicine and Humanitarian Awards for "integrity, clinical excellence and compassion," "outstanding humanism in medicine and integrity as a faculty member," and "compassion, empathy, respect and cultural sensitivity in the delivery of care to patients and their families."

Grodin's primary areas of interest include the relationship of health and human rights, medicine and the holocaust, and bioethics.

Selected bibliography
Grodin has delivered over 600 invited regional, national, and international addresses, written more than 200 scholarly papers, and edited or co-edited seven books.

Books
 
Book review:  
 
Book review: 
 
Book review: 
 
Book review:  Selected as second of the top ten humanitarian books of 1999.
 
 
 
 Grodin, Michael A. (forthcoming). Medical Halacha and Rabbinic Responsa in the Ghettos and Camps During the Holocaust.

Journal articles

References

1951 births
Living people
University of California, Los Angeles alumni
Harvard University people
Hastings Center Fellows
Boston University School of Public Health faculty
Massachusetts Institute of Technology alumni
Albert Einstein College of Medicine alumni
Boston University School of Medicine faculty